Sagara (Sagala) is a Bantu language of the Morogoro and Dodoma regions of Tanzania. It is sometimes called Southern Sagala to distinguish it from the Sagalla language of Kenya (Northern Sagala); the similarity of the names is a coincidence.

References

Languages of Tanzania
Northeast Coast Bantu languages